Fatoumata Karentao (born 8 November 1990) is a Malian footballer who plays as a goalkeeper. She has been a member of the Mali women's national team.

International career
Karentao capped for Mali at senior level during the 2018 Africa Women Cup of Nations qualification.

References

1990 births
Living people
Malian women's footballers
Mali women's international footballers
Women's association football goalkeepers
21st-century Malian people